The 1960 Buenos Aires Grand Prix was a Formula Libre race over 75 laps of the Parque Sarmiento circuit in Cordoba. The race was won by Maurice Trintignant in a Cooper T51.

Entry list

References

Buenos Aires
Buenos Aires Grand Prix
February 1960 sports events in South America
1960 in Argentine motorsport